Holton may refer to:

Places
In Canada:
Holton Creek (Pépeshquasati River), a river in Quebec

In the United Kingdom:
 Holton, Oxfordshire
 Holton, Somerset
 Holton, Suffolk (also known as Holton St. Peter to distinguish it from Holton St. Mary)
 Holton, Vale of Glamorgan
 Holton-le-Clay, Lincolnshire and its two former stations:
 Holton Village railway station 
 Holton Le Clay railway station
 Holton le Moor, Lincolnshire 
 Holton Le Moor railway station

In the United States:
 Holton, California, Los Angeles County
 Holton, California, former name of Holtville, California, Imperial County
 Holton, Indiana
 Holton, Kansas
 Holton Spring, a 1st magnitude spring in Hamilton County, Florida
 Holton Township, Michigan
 Holton, Wisconsin

Other uses
 Holton (surname)

See also
 Frank Holton Company, makers of the "Holton" trumpet, trombone, French horn, and euphonium
 Holton-Arms School, a private girls' school in Bethesda, Maryland, near Washington, D.C.
 Houlton (disambiguation)